Timothy Colin Harvey Luckhurst (born 8 January 1963) is a British journalist and academic, currently principal of South College of Durham University and an associate pro-vice-chancellor. Between 2007 and 2019 he was professor of Journalism at the University of Kent, and the founding head of the university's Centre for Journalism.

Luckhurst began his career as a journalist on BBC Radio 4's flagship Today programme before becoming a member of the team that designed and launched BBC Radio 5 Live. Between 1995 and 1997, he served as bi-media editor of national radio and television news programmes at BBC Scotland. He joined The Scotsman newspaper in 1997 as Assistant Editor (News) and was promoted to the role of Deputy Editor in 1998, before briefly becoming the editor in 2000.

Early life and career
Luckhurst was born in Sheffield, South Yorkshire, England. He was educated at Peebles High School in the Scottish Borders. He studied history at Robinson College, Cambridge, graduating in 1983.

Between 1985 and 1988 he worked as parliamentary press officer for Donald Dewar (then Shadow Secretary of State for Scotland) and for the Scottish Labour group of MPs at Westminster. He stood as the Labour candidate for the Roxburgh and Berwickshire constituency at the 1987 United Kingdom general election. He was critical of the party in 2001 and joined the Scottish Conservatives in 2005.

Luckhurst is a member of the Free Speech Union.

Career

Journalism 
Between 1987 and 1995, Luckhurst worked for the BBC on Radio 4's Today and was a member of the editorial team that designed and launched BBC Radio 5 Live. He covered the Romanian Revolution and the First Gulf War. He was the BBC's Washington, D.C. producer during the first year of the Clinton presidency and reported on the Waco Siege for BBC Radio. From 1995 to 1997 he was editor of national radio and television news programmes at BBC Scotland. Later he reported on the liberation of Kosovo and the fall of Slobodan Milošević for The Scotsman. Luckhurst joined The Scotsman as Assistant Editor in January 1997. He became Deputy Editor in January 1998 and was appointed Acting Editor in January 2000. He served as editor of The Scotsman between February and May 2000. Luckhurst was diagnosed with clinical depression and took medical leave. He claimed to have been "sacked as a direct consequence of my diagnosis."

Luckhurst is the author of Reporting the Second World War - The Press and the People 1939-1945 (London, Bloomsbury Academic 2023)  ','This Is Today – A Biography of the Today Programme (London, Aurum Press 2001) and Responsibility Without Power: Lord Justice Leveson's Constitutional Dilemma (Abramis Academic 2013) and co-wrote Assessing the Delivery of BBC Radio 5 Live's Public Service Commitments (Abramis Academic 2019).

In 2010, Luckhurst wrote a chapter Compromising the First Draft for the book Afghanistan War and the Media. In 2017, he contributed a chapter entitled Online and On Death Row: Historicising Newspapers in Crisis to the Routledge Companion to British Media History. He also contributed a chapter to the book, The Phone Hacking Scandal: Journalism on Trial. This chapter formed the basis of his submission to the Leveson Inquiry.

He has written for various publications including The Independent, The Guardian, the New Statesman, The Spectator, The Times, The New Republic, The Los Angeles Times , and The Globe and Mail. Luckhurst is a member of the editorial board of the media outlet The Conversation UK.

 Academic career 
In June 2007 he became professor of journalism and the news industry at the University of Kent's new Centre for Journalism. Luckhurst's academic research explores newspaper journalism during the first and second world wars and the era of appeasement. He has published in journals including Journalism Studies, Contemporary British History, 1914 -1918 Online: The International Encyclopedia of the First World War, British Journalism Review Ethical Space: The International Journal of Communication Ethics and George Orwell Studies. In May 2017 Luckhurst gave the keynote lecture Inspiring critical and ethical journalism at the Orwell Society's annual conference. His work has also been published in academic collections including  Writing the First World War after 1918.

At Kent, Luckhurst was a member of the team that launched KM Television, a local television station for Kent and Medway; he was a director of KM Television Ltd between 2016 and 2019. In 2012, Luckhurst was interviewed by The New York Times about the BBC's changes to its journalistic standards and bureaucratic procedures. Following a number of scandals, Luckhurst believed the problem to be that the BBC "wanted systems that could take responsibility instead of people.” As Head of the University of Kent's Centre for Journalism, Luckhurst led opposition to Lord Justice Leveson's proposal for officially sanctioned regulation of the British press. In Responsibility without Power: Lord Justice Leveson's Constitutional Dilemma he argued that 'An officially regulated press is the glib, easy, dangerous solution. It would spell the slow, painful death of a raucous, audacious and impertinent press able to speak truth to power on behalf of its readers and entertaining enough to secure their loyalty'.

In November 2019 he joined Durham University as the principal of the new South College, and associate pro-vice-chancellor (engagement).

 Controversies 
The Wind That Shakes the Barley
On 31 May 2006, The Guardian columnist George Monbiot criticised Luckhurst for his reaction to the film The Wind That Shakes the Barley (2006). Luckhurst described it as a "poisonously anti-British corruption of the history of the war of Irish independence" and compared director Ken Loach to Nazi propagandist Leni Riefenstahl. Responding to Luckhurst's claims, Monbiot wrote: "Occupations brutalise both the occupiers and the occupied. It is our refusal to learn that lesson which allows new colonial adventures to take place. If we knew more about Ireland, the invasion of Iraq might never have happened."

Emily Maitlis
As a former BBC editor, Luckhurst appeared on GB News in July 2021. His role was to discuss Newsnight presenter Emily Maitlis' criticism regarding fallout from Dominic Cummings' controversial trip to Barnard Castle during a COVID-19 lockdown. Luckhurst alleged Maitlis' criticism of both the government and BBC were "partisan" and they potentially breached impartiality of the BBC. He summarised that he believed she should apologise and withdraw the comments.

Durham Constabulary later found Cummings could have been guilty of breaking the law by "driving to test his own eyesight" but took no action, prompting widespread calls for the BBC to apologise to Maitlis for publicly rebuking her. The National Union of Journalists also criticised the BBC over its handling of the row, stating: "At a time of national crisis, frank and fearless journalism that scrutinises and holds this Government to account is more necessary than ever."

Rod Liddle
In December 2021 Luckhurst was the focus of controversy over a Christmas formal held at South College, during which Luckhurst's friend Rod Liddle was invited to speak, without students having been informed of his invitation. Liddle's speech included remarks that "a person with an X and a Y chromosome, that has a long, dangling penis, is scientifically a man" and "colonialism is not remotely the major cause of Africa's problems, just as [...] the educational underachievement of British people of Caribbean descent or African Americans is nothing to do with institutional or structural racism", prompting accusations of transphobia and racism. Some students left in protest before Liddle began to speak and several more left during his speech. Luckhurst shouted at students who walked out before the speech, calling them "pathetic". Luckhurst received criticism both for the decision to invite Liddle to speak at the Christmas dinner, and for his behaviour towards students during and after the speech. Liddle accused Durham University of "scapegoating" Luckhurst and "hanging him out to dry", adding that "they have treated an eminent and extremely talented professor despicably". Failing to note Liddell was making a speech, not participating in a debate, an editorial in The Times argued that everyone involved in the controversy had 'exercised their right to free speech peacefully' and argued that 'Professor Luckhurst's criticism, while perhaps intemperate, was mild enough for any educated adult to take'. It noted that Luckhurst had 'offered a prompt apology for his indiscreet but understandable rebuke' and urged both sides to move on.

Durham University subsequently announced an investigation into the events at the formal, with Luckhurst stepping back from all public duties until it had concluded, though students had initially demanded only an apology. The university investigation concluded in January 2022 and Luckhurst resumed all his duties as principal of the college and associate pro-vice-chancellor, but for confidentiality reasons the report was unpublished. The shift to calling for Luckhurst’s resignation is understood to have taken place after his wife, Dorothy, branded students "a bunch of inadequates".

Editing own Wikipedia page
In May 2022, the Durham University student newspaper, Palatinate accused Luckhurst of editing his own Wikipedia page under the username Gutterbluid. He declined to comment on the article.

BBC Scotland
In July 2022, Luckhurst agreed with former BBC Scotland lawyer Alistair Bonnington's claim that the corporation was "slavishly biased in favour of the Scottish National Party (SNP) who now form the devolved Holyrood government." Luckhurst told the Daily Mail that he thought the BBC was "under extreme pressure to do as the SNP wishes". He also claimed that "many of the BBC's young journalists appear to have nationalist sympathies", and called Bonnington "astute and brave [for identifying] a flaw that others have detected but chosen not to name". A BBC spokesman said "We responded comprehensively at the time to (Bonnington's) correspondence, fully rebutting the claims and standing by our journalism." Bonnington is a long-term critic of the SNP; in July 2016 he accused the party of running "a one-party government which tramples on the independence of the other arms of the state." This was denounced by the SNP as typically "vitriolic and over the top".

Personal life
In 1989, Luckhurst married Dorothy Williamson, who stood as the Conservative Party candidate in Blaydon in the 2005 general election, having been on the Conservative A-List.

The couple have four children; three daughters and one son. One of their daughters, Phoebe, is an author and current features editor at the Evening Standard''.

References

External links 

 

Living people
Academics of the University of Kent
People educated at Peebles High School, Peeblesshire
Alumni of Robinson College, Cambridge
BBC radio producers
BBC News people
Scottish newspaper editors
The Guardian people
The Scotsman people
Scottish Labour parliamentary candidates
1963 births
Journalism academics
People associated with Durham University
Conservative Party (UK) politicians